Ľubomíra Kurhajcová (born 11 October 1983) is a former professional Slovak tennis player. On 24 May 2004, she reached a career-high singles ranking of world No. 59. She never passed the first round of a Grand Slam championship in seven appearances but did get close at the 2004 French Open when she led Lisa Raymond 6–0, 5–0 in the first round and held two match points, only to lose the match 6–0, 5–7, 3–6.

Kurhajcová reached her first WTA Tour final in 2003 at the Pattaya Open, but lost to fellow Slovak Henrieta Nagyová. In doubles, she was a two-time runner-up, losing the 2004 Internazionali Femminili di Palermo final (teaming up with Nagyová) and the 2005 Copa Colsanitas final with Barbora Záhlavová-Strýcová.

WTA career finals

Singles: 1 (runner-up)

Doubles: 2 (runner-ups)

ITF Circuit finals

Singles: 8 (4–4)

Doubles: 6 (3–3)

References

External links
 
 
 
 
 

1983 births
Living people
Slovak female tennis players
Olympic tennis players of Slovakia
Tennis players at the 2004 Summer Olympics
Tennis players from Bratislava